Ilmtal is a former municipality in the district Ilm-Kreis, in Thuringia, Germany. In July 2018, it was merged into the town Stadtilm.

References

Ilm-Kreis
Former municipalities in Thuringia